The 2010 Dallas Cup was the 31st since its establishment, 16 teams entered in the tournament. The competition was sponsored by Dr Pepper.

Participating teams

From AFC:

  U-19

From CONCACAF:
  Vancouver Whitecaps
  Alajuelense
  Mexico U-20 
  Monterrey
  Guadalajara
  UANL
  CZ Elite
  Dallas  
  Dallas Texans 
  United States U-20

From CONMEBOL:

  Cruzeiro

From UEFA:

  Chelsea
  Tottenham Hotspur
  Eintracht Frankfurt
  1899 Hoffenheim

Standings

Group A

Group B

Group C

Group D

Semifinal

Third place playoff

Championship

Top Scorer

External links 
 2010 Dr Pepper Dallas Cup XXXI

2010
2010 in American soccer
Dallas Cup